The Lucerne Cheese Festival is a cheese festival held annually in Lucerne, Switzerland.

Gallery

Festivals in Switzerland
Cheese festivals
Annual events in Switzerland